Stuart Phillips (born September 9, 1929) is an American composer of film scores and television series theme music, conductor and record producer. He is perhaps best known for composing the theme tunes to the television series McCloud (TV series), Battlestar Galactica and Knight Rider.

Biography

Career
Phillips studied music at The High School of Music & Art in New York City, New York, and at the Eastman School of Music in Rochester, New York. While at Eastman, he began arranging music for the Rochester Civic Orchestra.

In 1958, Phillips began composing television and film scores. One of his first scores was for Columbia's 1964 movie, Ride the Wild Surf. He also founded Colpix Records and produced hits for Nina Simone, The Skyliners and Shelley Fabares, (pronounced 'fab bray'). Stu Phillips produced "Johnny Angel" for Shelly Fabares, who played the teen-age daughter on The Donna Reed Show. According to Joel Whitburn's 'Billboard Book of Top 40 Hits' "Johnny Angel" was released March 17, 1962, and was a #1 hit from April 7–20, 1962 staying on the charts for 13 weeks. There was also a follow-up hit to "Johnny Angel" called "Johnny Loves Me" which also made the Top 40 (#21) in July of '62.

In the mid-1960s, he worked for Capitol Records and created, produced and arranged for the easy listening studio orchestra the Hollyridge Strings. Excerpts from the Hollyridge Strings album The Beatles Song Book can be heard on the 1964 Capitol documentary album The Beatles' Story.

In the late 1960s and early 1970s, Phillips continued scoring films and television series including music for the films Beyond the Valley of the Dolls (1970), The Seven Minutes (1971) and the television series The Monkees and Get Christie Love!.

In 1974, he began working at Universal Studios scoring television series; Glen A. Larson made extensive use of his compositions. During this time, he scored music for the television series The Six Million Dollar Man, McCloud, and Battlestar Galactica. His Battlestar Galactica theme was featured prominently in the film Airplane II: The Sequel (1980). He also composed music for the television series The Amazing Spider-Man (which was for Charles Fries/Dan Goodman/Danchuck Productions) during this time.

In the 1980s, Phillips left Universal and began working at 20th Century Fox, again being a favorite composer of Glen A. Larson, where he composed music for the television series The Fall Guy, Automan and Knight Rider. All programs were Larson productions.

Later years
Phillips went into semi-retirement in the 1990s at his home in Studio City, California. Since that time, he has appeared at fan conventions for Battlestar Galactica and has attended cult-film screenings for Beyond the Valley of the Dolls.

In 2002, Phillips published his autobiography Stu Who?: Forty Years of Navigating the Minefields of the Music Business.

In 2006, he also participated in a documentary film featured on the special edition DVD re-release of Beyond the Valley of the Dolls.

Long a "serious" musician, Phillips has also orchestrated pieces by Ludwig van Beethoven and Sergei Rachmaninoff for Symphony orchestra.

Phillips can be heard on FaLaLaLaLa.com discussing the history of The Hollyridge Strings's Christmas album, which it released in 2008.

Filmography

Film music

 Mad Dog Coll (1961)
 The Man from the Diner's Club (1963)
 Ride the Wild Surf (1964)
 Dead Heat on a Merry-Go-Round (1966)
 Hells Angels on Wheels (1967)
The Name of the Game Is Kill! (1968)
 Angels from Hell (1968)
 2000 Years Later (1969)
 Run, Angel, Run! (1969)
 Follow Me (1969)
 The Gay Deceivers (1969)
 Venus in Furs (also known as  Paroxismus) (Uncredited, 1969)
 Beyond the Valley of the Dolls (1970)
 Nam's Angels (1970)

 The Curious Female (1970)
Savage Intruder (1970)
 The Red, White, and Black (1970)
 Revenge Is My Destiny (1971)
 Simon, King of the Witches (1971)
 The Seven Minutes (1971)
 Jud (1971)
 Pickup on 101 (1972)
 Throw Out the Anchor! (1974)
 How to Seduce a Woman (1974)
 Macon County Line (1974)
 The Meal (1975)
 Buck Rogers in the 25th Century (1979)
 Fast Charlie... the Moonbeam Rider (1979)
 Hollywood Goes to the Bowl 2004 (2004)

Television music

GL denotes a Glen Larson production, where known. Phillips was one of Larson's favorite composers.
 The Donna Reed Show (Unknown episodes, 1958)
 Rockabye the Infantry (1963)
 The Monkees (54 episodes, 1966–1968)
 The Six Million Dollar Man: Wine, Women and War (1973) GL
 Get Christie Love! (Unknown episodes, 1974) GL
 Switch (2 episodes, 1975) GL
 McCloud (8 episodes, 1974–1976) GL
 Benny and Barney: Las Vegas Undercover (1977)
 The Hardy Boys/Nancy Drew Mysteries (14 episodes, 1977) GL
 Quincy, M.E. (17 episodes, 1976–1977) GL
 The Amazing Spider-Man (Unknown episodes, 1978)
 Evening in Byzantium (1978)
 Battlestar Galactica (Pilot/TV movie, 1978) GL
 Buck Rogers in the 25th Century (1979) GL
 Battlestar Galactica (21 episodes, 1978–1979) GL
 The Misadventures of Sheriff Lobo (Unknown episodes, 1980–1981) GL
 Conquest of the Earth (1980) GL
 Galactica 1980 (Unknown episodes, 1980) GL

 B. J. and the Bear (1 episode, 1980) GL
 Battles: The Murder That Wouldn't Die (1980) GL
 Waikiki (1980)
 Midnight Lace (1981)
 Buck Rogers in the 25th Century (5 episodes, 1979–1981) GL
 The Fall Guy (Unknown episodes, 1981) GL
 Chicago Story (Unknown episodes, 1982)
 Terror at Alcatraz (1982)
 Rooster (1982)
 Automan (4 episodes, 1983) GL
 Masquerade (1 episode, 1983) GL
 Knight Rider (14 episodes, 1982–1984) GL
 Half Nelson (Unknown episodes, 1985) GL
 In Like Flynn (1985)
 The Highwayman (Pilot/TV Movie, 1987) GL
 The Highwayman (1 episode, 1988) GL
 The Road Raiders (1989)

Awards and nominations
Grammy Award

Nominated: 1964 Best Instrumental Performance - Non Jazz, The Beatles Song Book (Hollyridge Strings)
Nominated: 1979 Best Album of Original Score Written for a Motion Picture or a Television Special, Battlestar Galactica

BMI Film & TV Awards

Won: 2005 Best Ringtone, Knight Rider

Further reading
 Phillips, Stu. 2002. Stu Who?: Forty Years of Navigating the Minefields of the Music Business. Studio City, California. Cisum Press.

References

External links
 
 
 

1929 births
20th-century American conductors (music)
20th-century American male musicians
American film score composers
American male conductors (music)
American male film score composers
American male songwriters
American music arrangers
American television composers
Living people
Male television composers
Place of birth missing (living people)
Record producers from New York (state)
The High School of Music & Art alumni